Neal Marshad (born April 25, 1952) is an American film and television producer, director, cinematographer, advertising executive, internet strategist, and designer.

Personal life
Marshad was born on April 25, 1952, in Peekskill, New York, the son of Ruth Marshad and Look (American magazine) art director and graphic designer Jack Marshad. Marshad grew up in Croton-on-Hudson, New York and since 1975 Marshad resides in Tribeca in Lower Manhattan, New York City.   Starting in 1971, Marshad attended New York University, Tisch School of the Arts for Film and TV, with mentorship by his professor George C. Stoney who taught documentary filmmaking.  Marshad's classmates included Barry Sonnenfeld, Amy Heckerling, Susan Seidelman, Martin Brest, Mitchell Block and Leonard Maltin. Marshad married Erica Marshad, MSW in 1983 and they have two sons, Cameron Marshad and Tyler Marshad.

Career timeline

After graduating New York University Tisch School of the Arts in 1974, Marshad photographed and directed a PBS documentary, Sculpture by Isaac Witkin about Isaac Witkin that premiered in the United States on Public Broadcasting Service on October 19, 1976 and at The Metropolitan Museum of Art on November 7, 1976. 

Beginning in 1978, Marshad produced and photographed films for NBC's Saturday Night Live over a 43-year period.

Southside Johnny and the Asbury Jukes commissioned Marshad to direct a documentary film including a live broadcast concert at the Asbury Park Convention Hall on August 8, 1979. The film was first shown in January 1980 on Warner Cable's QUBE in Columbus, Ohio.

In 1982, Marshad won his first Emmy Award for outstanding achievement in directing and cinematography for his work for CBS Sports Super Bowl XVI

In 1982, Marshad formed Neal Marshad Productions, and began directing and producing films for IBM in the US and Europe using the ARPANET to facilitate global communications between crews and clients. IBM commissioned Marshad to direct a documentary film about architect Renzo Piano and the IBM Traveling Technology Pavilion in Paris.

In 1984 Marshad collaborated with actor/producer Michael Douglas,  Betsy Gotbaum, and Rolling Stone Magazine's publisher Jann Wenner, and the New York City Police Department to produce and direct a documentary film about handgun ownership  dedicated to John Lennon.

In 1989, Marshad produced and directed the television documentary The Conspiracy of Silence  with actress Kathleen Turner.

In 1989 and 1990, Marshad produced, directed and photographed two standup comedy specials hosted by Improvisation Comedy Club founder Budd Friedman and sponsored by Johnnie Walker. The one-hour specials were broadcast respectively on The Comedy Channel in 1989 and on Comedy Central in 1990, for which Marshad directed then unknown comedians Steve Harvey, Ray Romano, Brian Kiley, Judd Apatow and Ellen Cleghorne.

In 1993, while working for IBM Latin America, and directing a documentary film about making the Vatican Library accessible online, Marshad pioneered streaming video on the internet, and was first to stream a video on a BBC’s website in 1995.

On December 17, 1995, the New York Times reported on a group art show and published Marshad's photograph. The photograph was of Denise Brown’s hands wearing the bracelet her sister Nicole Brown Simpson wore when she was slain.  Another photograph Marshad created, one depicting the hands of Jerry Della Femina, was also included in the show "Nonviolent Hands" at the Vered Gallery, East Hampton, New York.

In 1996, Marshad formed The Marshad Technology Group, a digital agency, and was hired by clients including Chanel, Neiman Marcus, Beiersdorf La Prairie, and the BBC to strategize, create and launch their internet businesses.  In the same year, he was commissioned by Speedo, the swimwear manufacturer, to create and launch Speedo.com. Marshad was the first to enable email communication between Olympic athletes and sports fans online, for the Olympics Summer games in Atlanta, Georgia.

In 1997, Marshad started to collaborate with playwright Edward Albee and Martha Wadsworth Coigney  to create the first website for the International Theatre Institute. The goal of the website was to promote open and free communications among playwrights, actors, directors and all people working in theater around the world. For that effort, Marshad directed and streamed audio interviews which he recorded of Albee. This was the first recorded performance Albee allowed to be published on the web.

In 1998, Marshad worked as segment producer and cinematographer on the TV special Saturday Night Live: The Best of Phil Hartman, collaborating with writer/director Tom Schiller and actors Phil Hartman and Jan Hooks which became the last tribute to Hartman in a special send off by all the current and past SNL cast members who worked with Hartman including Candice Bergen, Dana Carvey, Danny DeVito, Will Ferrell, Chris Kattan, Steve Martin, Mike Myers, Chris Rock, Adam Sandler, and William Shatner. Al Franken was one of the writers as well as Conan O'Brien and others.

Marshad was director of photography (videographer) for the USC Shoah Foundation Institute for Visual History and Education interviews of Martin Greenfield in Westhampton, New York. Under the direction of Steven Spielberg, the Foundation has collected the permanent testimony of over 52,000 holocaust survivors, liberators, rescuers, and war crimes trial participants.

Marshad collaborated again with playwright Edward Albee to direct videos of his performances at the Jack Lenor Larsen sculpture garden at LongHouse Reserve, East Hampton, New York in 1999.

Marshad was hired in October 1999 by Janet Gurwitch, founder of Laura Mercier Cosmetics to provide strategy, design and technology for www.lauramercier.com.

In September 2001, Marshad collaborated with actor Jerry Stiller, jazz singer Cassandra Wilson and actress Kathleen Turner, to direct and produce "What Can I Do?" a public service television campaign for the Citizens Committee for New York City to help residents recover from the destruction of the September 11 attacks. Marshad had previously collaborated with the Citizens Committee for New York City starting in 1977  to help NYC residents recover from New York City blackout of 1977 and David Berkowitz (the "Son of Sam") and created the "Who Cares About NYC?" public service television campaign with Diane von Fürstenberg, Otto Preminger, Robert Merrill, Jack Gilford, Dina Merrill, Cliff Robertson, Gato Barbieri, Alan King (comedian), Robert Klein, Henny Youngman, and others.

Marshad is currently an executive producer for Eurocinema vod, the Video-On-Demand television network available specializing in European box office films that is in 35 million United States homes.

In August 2011 Marshad signed an agreement with the Apollo Theater to exclusively direct, develop, joint venture and produce musical and comedy filmed entertainment for online streaming to worldwide audiences.

In 2012 Marshad worked as segment producer, segment director, and segment director of photography for a TV special produced by and starring Steve Harvey.

The Marshad Technology Group achieved Google Partner status in March, 2014. Marshad was asked, in May 2014, to become DOWNTOWN magazine's Digital Media Advisor, and was offered a board position.

On October 11, 2014, "Love is a Dream", a film Marshad produced and photographed, was broadcast on Saturday Night Live as a tribute to former cast member Jan Hooks who died on October 8, 2014. The film was included in the Saturday Night Live 25th Anniversary Special airing on September 25, 1999 which won the 2000 Primetime Emmy Award for Outstanding Variety, Music or Comedy Special. and the show was nominated for the 2000 Emmy Award for Outstanding Technical Direction, Camerawork, Video for a Miniseries, Movie or Special. "Love is a Dream" was also included in the Saturday Night Live 40th Anniversary Special which aired on February 15, 2015.

Steve Harvey and Deep Dish Productions of Chicago, LLC contracted with Marshad in October 2015 to provide Segment Producer/Director/Director of Photography services for The Steve Harvey Show on NBC.

In June 2016, Marshad was named to the International Advisory Board of LongHouse Reserve, by Jack Lenor Larsen, East Hampton (town), New York.

In November 2016, Microsoft asked Marshad to become a Microsoft Bing Partner Agency.

On November 20, 2021, "Java Junkie", a film Marshad produced and photographed, was broadcast on Saturday Night Live as a tribute to former cast member and writer Peter Aykroyd.

References

External links
 https://www.marshad.com
 NYTimes.com News From the Advertising Industry article
 Marshad Technology Group/Neal Marshad Productions' Facebook Page
 NYTimes.com Style Section article
 Steve Harvey Official Website
 Cassandra Wilson: "Sing With Your Neighbors" Cassandra Wilson "Sing With Your Neighbors" TV spot
 Get off your Tuchas! - Jerry Stiller Jerry Stiller "Get Off Your Tuchas!" TV spot
 Watch Jan Hooks And Phil Hartman In The Weird, Gorgeous Love Is A Dream
 Saturday Night Live - NBC.com
 http://www.newsday.com/entertainment/tv/jan-hooks-phil-hartman-in-saturday-night-live-s-love-is-a-dream-1.9488676
 Saturday Night Live "Love is a Dream"
 Who We Are "International Advisory Board, LongHouse Reserve
 Saturday Night Live recap: Billie Eilish is the latest guest to pull double duty

1952 births
Living people
American film producers
People from Peekskill, New York
Tisch School of the Arts alumni
People from Croton-on-Hudson, New York
Film directors from New York (state)